Hubert Isaac Pollack (1903 - 1967) was a German Jew whose clandestine activity prior to the Holocaust enabled him and his associates to save a large number of Jews. After his immigration to Israel he served in the Hagana and the Israeli Defense Forces.

Biography 

Pollack was born in Berlin to Wilhelm and Johanna. He studied at the University of Berlin from 1921 to 1927 where he earned a PhD in economics and philosophy. From 1923 to 1929 he worked at the offices of Keren Hayesod - The United Israel Appeal in the state of Rhineland Westphalia-Bonn.
During the years 1930 to 1933 he managed the office of statistics of the Jewish Community of Berlin. From 1933 to 1939 he was a consultant with the Palestine office of the community in Berlin. During those years he worked with Capt. Francis Frank Foley, a British Intelligence officer positioned in Berlin and whose cover title was the director of the visa office at the British Embassy. There was a clear designation of responsibilities: Wilfrid received requests from Jews, made lists of the names, raised the required funds and transferred them to Pollack. Pollack created contacts with Gestapo officers and gave them the names he received from Wilfrid, together with the bribes. Foley supplied the exit visas, prioritizing Jews who already blacklisted by the Gestapo. The story of this organization is related in the film The Essential Link: The Story of Wilfrid Israel from Yonatan Nir.

In August 1939, aided by Foley he left Berlin with his family and made his way to Palestine.

Based on Pollack's testimony, parts of which were given during the Eichmann trial in 1961, Yad VaShem awarded Foley the title of Righteous Among the Nations.  For details regarding their mutual operations see the book Foley: The Spy Who Saved 10,000 Jews by Michael Smith.

Pollack raised donations from survivors and former Berliners to commemorate Foley by planting a tree in his name in a Jewish National Fund (KKL) forest near the entrance to Kibbutz Har'el on the way to Jerusalem.

Pollack served in the Hagana while working for the British Mandate government. He fought during the siege on Jerusalem and continued as a research officer with the Israeli Intelligence Corps until he retired. Pollack died a week after the Six Day War (1967), not knowing that Foley would be honored by the Jewish people.

References

External links 
 Hubert Pollack- Second World War  >Nazi Germany  >Hubert Pollack
 
 

Jewish emigrants from Nazi Germany to Mandatory Palestine
1967 deaths
1903 births
British intelligence operatives
Haganah members